Quri Winchus (Quechua quri gold, winchus hummingbird, "gold hummingbird", hispanicized spellings Cori Vinchos, Cori-Vinchos, Corivinchos) is an archaeological site with remains of circular buildings of the Wanka period in Peru. It is located in the Junín Region, Jauja Province, Canchayllo District. The site was declared  a National Cultural Heritage by Resolución Directoral Nacional No. 925 on September 18, 2001.

See also 
 Hatunmarka
 Tunanmarka
 Waqlamarka

References 

Archaeological sites in Peru
Archaeological sites in Junín Region